The Rivers State Ministry of Budget and Economic Planning is a government ministry of Rivers State, Nigeria responsible for drafting economic priorities and programmes of government as well as sporadic methods of implementation, with a view to improving the standard of living and quality of life of the citizenry. The ministry also handles "the preparation of the Rivers State annual budget as well as ensure that budget implementation is in accordance with the policy of the state government."

See also
List of government ministries of Rivers State

References

Budget and Economic Planning
Economy of Rivers State
Subnational economy ministries
Old GRA, Port Harcourt